St Michael and All Angels, Blackheath is an Anglican parish church in Blackheath, London. The church is a part of the Diocese of Southwark. This Grade II* listed building was designed by the architect George Smith.

History

St Michael and All Angels is located in the Cator Estate in Blackheath. The estate was purchased by John Cator in 1783. The area purchased included the Wricklemarsh mansion along with its 250-acre estate, previously owned by Sir Gregory Page. Following Cator's death in 1806, the estate was inherited by his nephew John Barwell Cator (1791–1850). As there was no church close to the residents of the estate, Cator provided a portion of land and £4,000 towards the construction of the church.

The foundations were laid on 20 December 1828 and the building was completed in February 1830. The architect was George Smith and the builder was William Moore, a local bricklayer and carpenter.
The chapel was consecrated as the parish church of St Michael and All Angels in 1874. Until then, the church had been called either Trinity or St Peter’s Chapel or simply ‘Mr Cator’s chapel'.

Architecture
The church was designed in a Gothic style unusual for the 1830s. The steeple is placed unusually at the east end of the building. The location is thought to have been intended to attract attention as seen from the crossroads of the estate. The building is made of white Gault bricks with Bath stone dressings and roofed with Welsh slate.

The stone pulpit was erected in 1920 as a World War I memorial.

References

External links
 

19th-century Church of England church buildings
Anglican Diocese of Southwark
Grade II* listed buildings in the Royal Borough of Greenwich
Grade II* listed churches in London